El Candidato is a 2016 Peruvian political comedy satire film written and directed by Alvaro Velarde. Starring Manolo Rojas, Hernán Vidaurre and Guillermo Rossini. The film premiered on July 21, 2016, in Peruvian theaters. It won at the Figueira Film Art de Portugal Film Festival in the category of Best Screenplay.

Synopsis 
The story of four politicians who want to reach the presidential seat and their strategies to increase their popularity, along with the influence of their families and campaign teams.

Cast 
The actors participating in this film are:

 Manolo Rojas as Napoleón Cordoba
 Hernán Vidaurre as Ego Pereira
 Guillermo Rossini as Mr. Huapaya
 Giovanna Castro as Ego's Advisor
 Alberick Garcia Cerna as Amaru Huapaya
 Bernie Paz as Mickey
 César Ritter as Honorato Contreras
 David Villanueva as Spanish Advisor

Production 
The filming was divided into 2 parts, the first stage began on December 13, 2015, and ended on the 23rd of the same month. The second stage began in mid-January.

References

External links 
 

2016 films
2016 comedy films
Peruvian political comedy films
2010s Peruvian films
2010s Spanish-language films
Films set in Peru
Films shot in Peru
Films about political movements